The FTBOA Wildcat Heir Stakes is a Thoroughbred horse race open to horses of either sex age three and older who are a registered Florida-bred sired by an FSS eligible stallion. It is contested at a distance of six furlongs.

The first running took place on September 29, 2018 at Gulfstream Park in Hallandale Beach, Florida as part of the Florida Thoroughbred Breeders' & Owners' Association (FTBOA) Florida Sire series.

The race is named for Wildcat Heir, a Florida-bred multiple stakes winner who was a four-time leading sire in Florida.

Owner Harold Queen and trainer David Fawkes won the first and the third of the three editions of the Wildcat Heir Stakes run since inception. They had previously enjoyed national and international recognition with their outstanding colt Big Drama who won the 2010 Breeders' Cup Sprint and was voted the Eclipse Award as that year's American Champion Sprint Horse. 
https://www.ntra.com/eclipse-awards/history/

Records
Speed record:
 1:35.34 @ 1 mile: Noble Drama (2020)

Most wins:
 Noble Drama (2018, 2020)

Most wins by a jockey:
 No jockey has won this race more than once

Most wins by a trainer:
 2 - David Fawkes

Most wins by an owner:
 2 - Harold L. Queen

Winners

References

Restricted stakes races in the United States
Gulfstream Park
Horse races in Florida
Recurring sporting events established in 2018
2018 establishments in Florida